Bârca is a commune in Dolj County, Oltenia, Romania with a population of  4,500  people. It is composed of a single village, Bârca.

Natives
Marin Ceaușu (1891–1954), brigadier-general during World War II

References

Communes in Dolj County
Localities in Oltenia